Nassarius mirabilis is a species of sea snail, a marine gastropod mollusk in the family Nassariidae, the nassa mud snails or dog whelks.

Description
The length of the shell varies between 9.5 mm and 13 mm.

Distribution
This species occurs in the Indian Ocean off Southern Madagascar.

References

External links
 

Nassariidae
Gastropods described in 2007